"Yashar" is a single by Cabaret Voltaire. The single is two remixes by John Robie of a track from their 1982 album 2x45. A version of the song also appears on the live album Hai! (Live in Japan).

The single was released in May 1983 on Factory Benelux (FBN 25) and Factory Records UK (FAC 82). It reached No. 6 on the UK Indie Chart.

The track features a sample "The 70 billion people of Earth — where are they hiding?" from the Outer Limits episode "Demon with a Glass Hand".

As well as the 5:00 and 7:20 versions on the single, a 6:36 version was released on the 1983 compilation LP Factory Benelux Greatest Hits.

Further remixes of the track were released on Mute Records' NovaMute imprint in 2003 (12", NovaMute 12-NoMu-121, 9 June 2003).

References

1983 singles
Factory Records singles
1982 songs